Sawmills Studios is a recording studio founded in 1974 by record producer, Tony Cox. It is located in Golant, on the banks of the River Fowey in Cornwall. 

The studio building is located on the tidal creek on the banks of the Fowey. Sawmills were one of the first residential recording facilities in the UK. The main building is a former 17th-century water mill and the site has a documented history stretching back to the 11th century. The location is unusual as it can only be accessed by boat or the Saints' Way footpath that runs past the studio.

It was most notably used by musicians such as The Stone Roses ("Fools Gold"), The Verve (A Storm in Heaven), Muse, Oasis (Definitely Maybe), Catatonia, Ride, Swans, and Supergrass. 

In July 2020, the studio and property were listed for sale.

Dangerous Records
The present owner of the studio, Dennis Smith, formed a record label based at Sawmills, Dangerous Records, releasing the first two EPs by Muse, who began their career at Sawmills, and later formed Taste Media for the band.

References

External links

Recording studios in England
Music venues in Cornwall